First National Bank Building, or variants thereof, may refer to:

Japan
 First National Bank Building (Tokyo)

United States
''Alphabetical by state, then city
 First National Bank Building (Andalusia, Alabama), listed on the National Register of Historic Places (NRHP)
 First National Bank Building (Monette, Arkansas), NRHP-listed
 First National Bank Center (San Diego, California)
 First National Bank Building (San Diego), part of the Gaslamp Quarter Historic District
 First National Bank Building (Craig, Colorado), NRHP-listed
 First National Bank Building (Denver, Colorado)
 First National Bank Building (Steamboat Springs, Colorado), NRHP-listed
 First National Bank Building (Wellington, Colorado), listed on the NRHP in Colorado
 First National Bank Building (Hartford, Connecticut)
 First National Bank Building (Pensacola, Florida)
 First National Bank Building (Atlanta, Georgia), now State of Georgia Building
 First National Bank Building (Danville, Illinois), NRHP-listed
 First National Bank Building (Terre Haute, Indiana), NRHP-listed
 First National Bank Building (Davenport, Iowa), NRHP-listed
 First National Bank Building (Fort Dodge, Iowa), NRHP-listed
 First National Bank (Mount Pleasant, Iowa), NRHP-listed
 First National Bank (Ottumwa, Iowa), NRHP-listed
 First National Bank Building (Highland, Kansas), NRHP-listed
 First National Bank Building (Smith Center, Kansas), NRHP-listed
 First National Bank Building (Paintsville, Kentucky), NRHP-listed
 First National Bank Building (Boston, Massachusetts)
 First National Bank Building (Alpha, Michigan), NRHP-listed
 First National Bank Building (Ann Arbor, Michigan), NRHP-listed
 First National Bank building (Menominee, Michigan), downtown Menominee, Michigan
 First National Bank (St. Cloud, Minnesota), NRHP-listed
 First National Bank Building (Saint Paul, Minnesota)
 First National Bank Building (Bolivar, Missouri), listed on the NRHP in Polk County, Missouri
 First National Bank Building (Lincoln, Nebraska)
 First National Bank Building (Omaha, Nebraska), NRHP-listed
 First National Bank Building (Albuquerque, New Mexico), NRHP-listed
 First National Bank Building (Charlotte, North Carolina) or 112 Tryon Plaza
 First National Bank Building (Creedmoor, North Carolina)
 First National Bank Building (Gastonia, North Carolina)
 First National Bank Building (Elyria, Ohio), listed on the NRHP in Ohio
 First National Bank and Trust Building (Lima, Ohio), NRHP-listed
 First National Bank Building (Massillon, Ohio), listed on the NRHP in Ohio
 First National Bank Building (Youngstown, Ohio), listed on the NRHP in Ohio
 First National Bank Building (Stratford, Oklahoma)
 First National Bank Building (Tulsa, Oklahoma)
 First National Bank Building (Portland, Oregon), NRHP-listed
 First National Bank Tower (Portland, Oregon), now Wells Fargo Center (Portland, Oregon)
 First National Bank Building, now Capitol Center, Salem, Oregon
 First National Bank Building (Pittsburgh)
 First National Bank Building (Custer, South Dakota), listed on the NRHP in South Dakota
 First National Bank Building of Vermillion (Vermillion, South Dakota), listed on the NRHP in South Dakota
 First National Bank Building (Webster, South Dakota), listed on the NRHP in South Dakota
 First National Bank Building (Beaumont, Texas)
 First National Bank Building (Fort Worth, Texas)
 First National Bank Building (Jayton, Texas)
 First National Bank Building (Meridian, Texas), listed on the NRHP in Texas
 First National Bank Building (Stephenville, Texas), listed on the NRHP in Texas
 First National Bank Building (Sweetwater, Texas), listed on the NRHP in Texas
 First National Bank Building (Terrell, Texas), listed on the NRHP in Texas
 First National Bank Building (Richmond, Virginia)
 First National Bank (Rhinelander, Wisconsin), NRHP-listed 
 First National Bank Building (Rock Springs, Wyoming), NRHP-listed

See also
 First National Bank (disambiguation)